Lauren McConnell may refer to:

Lauren McConnell (performer) on Grease Is the Word
Loren McConnell, fictional character